Edwards v. National Coal Board was an important case in English case law. The 1949 case revolved around whether it was "reasonably practicable" to prevent even the smallest possibility of a rock fall in a coal mine.

Underlying facts
Mr Edwards died in an accident after the supporting structure for the mine roadway gave way. The National Coal Board argued that it was too expensive to shore up every roadway in all of the mines.

The case turned when it was decided that it was not 'all of the roadways' that needed shoring up; just the ones that required it. In essence this established the need to carry out a risk assessment to establish the cost, time and trouble to mitigate a risk balanced against the risk of any harm it might cause.

Asquith stated in his judgement:

Significance
This case established the concept of "reasonable practicability." The Court of Appeal decided that "reasonably practicable" was a more narrowly defined phrase than what was "physically possible." This allowed for the creation of equations that measured the risk present in a given situation against the reasonable practicability of mitigating that risk. In other words, the equation asked if averting the risk was worth the effort it took to negate that risk. In addition, the court in Edwards determined that the size and wealth of the company should have no bearing on such decisions.

See also 
 ALARP
 National Coal Board

References

Court of Appeal (England and Wales) cases
1949 in the environment
1949 in British law
1949 in case law